Liverpool Cenotaph stands on St George's Plateau, to the east of St George's Hall in Liverpool, England. It was erected as a memorial to those who had fallen in the First World War. The dates of the Second World War were subsequently added. The cenotaph consists of a rectangular block of stone on a stone platform, with bronze, low-relief sculptures on the sides depicting marching troops and mourners. It was designed by Lionel Budden, with carving by Herbert Tyson Smith. Initially designated as a Grade II listed building, its status was raised to Grade I in 2013.

History

In 1926, a competition was held to create a memorial using public funds, with Charles Reilly, professor of architecture at the University of Liverpool, as assessor. There were 257 entrants; the winning, anonymised entry was by Reilly's assistant, Lionel Budden. The building contractors appointed were A. E. Bradley and Company, the sculptor was Herbert Tyson Smith, and his bronze sculptures were made at the foundry of the Morris-Singer Company. The cenotaph was unveiled at 11 am on 11 November 1930 by the 17th Earl of Derby.

Following the end of the Second World War, the dates 1939 and 1945 were added. These were unveiled on Remembrance Sunday, 10 November 1946, by William G. Gregson, Lord Mayor of Liverpool.

Description

The cenotaph consists of a rectangular block of Stancliffe stone, with bronze relief statues on the sides, standing on a platform of Yorkshire Silex stone. It is orientated northeast–southwest, in parallel with St George's Hall. The bronze relief on the northwest face, opposite the hall, depicts a stream of marching troops in the uniforms of the various armed forces. Above the panel is an inscription reading AS UNKNOWN AND YET WELL KNOWN AS DYING AND BEHOLD WE LIVE, and below, the inscription reads OUT OF THE NORTH PARTS A GREAT COMPANY AND A MIGHTY ARMY. On the southeast face, facing Lime Street station, the panel depicts mourners laying flowers and wreaths on a Stone of Remembrance, with rows of graves in a military cemetery behind them. Above the panel the inscription reads TO THE MEN OF LIVERPOOL WHO FELL IN THE GREAT WAR with an added inscription below it reads AND ALL WHO HAVE FALLEN IN CONFLICT SINCE. Under the panel is an inscription reading AND THE VICTORY THAT DAY WAS TURNED INTO MOURNING UNTO ALL THE PEOPLE. On the shorter northeast and southwest faces are circular bronze shields with the coat of arms of Liverpool and festoons, and the dates of the two wars.

Appraisal

The cenotaph was designated as a Grade II listed building on 28 June 1952. On 8 November 2013, the designation was raised to Grade I. The reasons given for the designation include its design context with its "impressive location" adjacent to St George's Hall. Also noted is the architectural interest of the cenotaph, with its horizontal lines forming a foil to the vertical columns of the hall. Referring to its sculptural interest, the citation states that the "sculptural work is exceptional and is arguably Tyson Smith's finest and most powerful work". The design is considered to have contemporary significance in that rather than using "allegory and heroic idealisation", it employs "powerful and modern realist portrayals". The quality of its craftsmanship is praised, and it is also to have group value in its location near other listed buildings. In the Pevsner Architectural Guides, Sharples expresses the opinion that "it is one of the most remarkable war memorials in the country".

See also

Grade I listed buildings in Liverpool
Grade I listed war memorials in England

Notes and references

Notes

Citations

Grade I listed buildings in Liverpool
World War I memorials in England
World War II memorials in England
Outdoor sculptures in England
Monuments and memorials in Liverpool
Buildings and structures completed in 1930
Bronze sculptures in the United Kingdom
Cenotaphs in the United Kingdom
Grade I listed monuments and memorials